A climograph is a graphical representation of a location's basic climate. Climographs display data for two variables: (a) monthly average temperature and (b) monthly average precipitation. These are useful tools to quickly describe a location's climate.

Representation

While temperature is typically visualized using a line, some climographs opt to visualize the data using a bar. This method's advantage allows the climograph to display the average range in temperature (average minimum and average maximum temperatures) rather than a simple monthly average.

Use
The patterns in a climograph describe not just a location's climate but also provide evidence for that climate's relative geographical location. For example, a climograph with a narrow range in temperature over the year might represent a location close to the equator, or alternatively a location adjacent to a large body of water exerting a moderating effect on the temperature range. Meanwhile, a wide range in annual temperature might suggest the opposite. We could also derive information about a site's ecological conditions through a climograph. For example, if precipitation is consistently low year-round, we might suggest the location reflects a desert; if there is a noticeable seasonal pattern to the precipitation, we might suggest the location experiences a monsoon season. When combining the temperature and precipitation patterns together, we have even better clues as to the local conditions. Despite this, it is important to note that a number of local factors contribute to the patterns observed in a particular place; therefore, a climograph is not a foolproof tool that captures all the geographic variation that might exist.

References

External links

https://climatecharts.net/ - Webapplication for generating climographs for places worldwide dynamically.
 ClimateCharts.net an interactive climate analysis web platform https://doi.org/10.1080/17538947.2020.1829112 (Open Access)

Climate and weather statistics
Meteorological data and networks
Graphs (images)